Joseph James Johnson (23 June 1900–1976) was an English footballer who played in the Football League for Accrington Stanley, Barnsley, Crystal Palace, Halifax Town, West Ham United and Wigan Borough.

References

1900 births
1976 deaths
English footballers
Association football forwards
English Football League players
Cannock Town F.C. players
Crystal Palace F.C. players
Barnsley F.C. players
West Ham United F.C. players
Southend United F.C. players
Walsall F.C. players
Wigan Borough F.C. players
Halifax Town A.F.C. players
Accrington Stanley F.C. (1891) players
Cradley Heath F.C. players